The Green and Red of Mayo is a song by the Saw Doctors. It first appeared on the album All the Way from Tuam in 1992.

It is an unofficial ballad of Mayo county football team supporters.

See also
 Mayo GAA
 The Saw Doctors

References

1992 songs
Mayo GAA